Mavis Enderby is a hamlet and civil parish in the East Lindsey district of Lincolnshire, England.

History
An early reference may be seen in 1349 when both parts of the name appear to end in "by", i.e. Maleby Senderby  A later spelling, 1430, may be "Malvyssh Enderby"

Literary references
Mavis Enderby had a peal of bells named after it, called The Brides of Enderby, which is mentioned in Jean Ingelow's poem The High Tide on the Coast of Lincolnshire 1571: in the poem, the ringing of the Enderby bells is the generally recognised signal of approaching danger to the neighbouring countryside: "Came down that kindly message free, the Brides of Mavis Enderby".
 
An extract from the poem is at the head of Rudyard Kipling's short story, At the Pit's Mouth.

Douglas Adams used the name "Mavis Enderby" in his spoof The Meaning of Liff dictionary "of things that there aren't any words for yet". Adams assigned meanings to placenames based on what he imagined them to mean, Mavis Enderby, becoming "The almost-completely-forgotten girlfriend from your distant past for whom your wife has a completely irrational jealousy and hatred".

Mavis Enderby was also used as the name of a character in Helen Fielding's Bridget Jones's Diary.

St Michael's Church

The parish church is dedicated to St Michael. Dating from the 14th and 15th centuries, the church was restored by James Fowler in 1875. The tower was rebuilt by C. Hodgson Fowler in 1894. The exterior is of squared greenstone rubble, with limestone ashlar dressings. It has Welsh and Westmorland slate roofs with decorative tiled ridges. The church interior comprises a nave, western tower, south aisle and porch, and a chancel. At the threshold of the west door to the tower is set part of a coped or round-topped 11th- century Saxon grave slab, possibly placed here in 1894. The churchyard has the remains of a 14th-century churchyard cross.

In the porch is a Norman pillar piscina, a stone basin for draining water used in the rinsing of the chalice. The churchyard has a sundial erected by a former rector.

See also
Bag Enderby
Wood Enderby
Enderby, Leicestershire

References

External links

Villages in Lincolnshire
Civil parishes in Lincolnshire
East Lindsey District